General elections were held in Azad Kashmir in 1970 to elect the members of first assembly of Azad Kashmir.

References

Elections in Azad Kashmir
1970 elections in Pakistan